Barceloneic acid may refer to:

 Barceloneic acid A
 Barceloneic acid B
 Barceloneic acid C